John L. Semmann (March 18, 1822 – January 19, 1907) was a member of the Wisconsin State Assembly.

Biography
John Leborius Semmann was born on March 18, 1822, in Koslin, Prussia. He married Eva Juditha Koch and had eleven children. Semmann died on January 19, 1907, in Milwaukee, Wisconsin, and was buried there.

Career
Semmann was a Democratic member of the Assembly during the 1871 and 1874 sessions.

References

External links

People from Koszalin
Prussian emigrants to the United States
Politicians from Milwaukee
1822 births
1907 deaths
Burials in Wisconsin
19th-century American politicians
Democratic Party members of the Wisconsin State Assembly